The Pentax Optio L40 is a digital camera by Pentax which was released in October 2007. The digital camera has 8.0 megapixels, 22MB internal memory, 3x Optical zoom and a 4x Digital zoom.

References
http://www.camera-usermanual.com/pentax-optio-l40.html

L40
Cameras introduced in 2007